Northdale Stadium is a multi-use stadium in Pietermaritzburg, KwaZulu-Natal, South Africa. It is currently used mostly for football matches and is the home venue of Maritzburg City in the Vodacom League.

Sports venues in KwaZulu-Natal
Buildings and structures in Pietermaritzburg
Soccer venues in South Africa